The Grand Auverné Formation is a geologic formation in France. It preserves fossils dating back to the Darriwilian to Sandbian (Dobrotivian in the regional stratigraphy) stages of the Ordovician period.

Description 
The formation comprises dark shales with fine laminations, fossiliferous nodules, and occasional lenticles, bioturbation, sand and pyrite.

Fossil content 
The following fossils were reported from the formation:

Trilobites 

 Basilicus sp.
 Bumastus sp.
 Colpocoryphe sp.
 Dionide sp.
 Eccoptochile sp.
 Ectillaenus sp.
 Eodalmanitina sp.
 Neseuretus sp.
 Nobiliasaphus sp.
 Ogygites sp.
 Pateraspis sp.
 Placoparia sp.
 Prionocheilus sp.
 Salterocoryphe sp.
 Selenopeltis sp.
 Uralichas sp.
 Zeliszkella sp.
 ?Onnia sp.

Graptoloidea 
 Didymograptus sp.

See also 
 List of fossiliferous stratigraphic units in France

References

Bibliography 
 J. Pillet. 1993. La faune des "Schistes a nodules" d'Angers (Llandeilo inferieur); I, Les trilobites. Memoire - Societe d'Etudes Scientifiques de l'Anjou 12

Geologic formations of France
Ordovician System of Europe
Ordovician France
Darriwilian
Sandbian
Shale formations
Open marine deposits
Ordovician south paleopolar deposits
Paleontology in France
Formations